is a Japanese musical arranger and guitarist under Being Inc. records.

Biography

In 1978, he debuted with his own blues band  under Trio Records. In 1990s he entered to Being recording agency. Takeshi becomes the main arranger of Japanese singer-songwriter Maki Ohguro. Along with Masao Akashi they were the most busy arrangers during 90s. During the same period time he provided  arrangements for another Being artist as Zard, Deen or Wands as is under charge of arranging famous million-sells hits as Makenaide, Kono Mama Kimi Dake wo Ubaisaritai, Motto Tsuyoku Kimi wo Dakishimetara or Anata Dake Mitsumeteru. After establishment of Giza Studio he continued providing arrangements for artist as Aiuchi Rina, U-ka Saegusa in dB or Aya Kamiki. Takeshi appears sometimes as a supportive guitarist in hills PanKoujou Live. Since 2012, he's a music teacher of rock and pop department in Senzoku Gakuen of Music. In celebration of his 60 birthday, he held special live with former vocalist of Field of View, U-ya Asaoka.  He's active as of 2021.

List of provided works as an arranger

Maki Ohguro
Harlem Nights
La La La
Natsu ga Kuru
Atsuku Nare
Anata Dake Mitsumeteru
Chotto
Da Da Da
Shiroi Graduation
Eien no Yume ni Mukatte
Ichiban Chikaku ni Ite ne
etc.

Zard
Makenaide
My Friend
Iki mo Dekinai
Kimi ni Aitaku Nattara...
Sayonara wa Ima mo Kono Mune ni Imasu
Ai ga Mienai
Just Believe in Love
Don't You See!
Get U're Dream
Heart ni Hi wo Tsukete

Deen
Kono Mama Kimi Dake wo Ubaisaritai
Memories
Omoi Kiri Waratte
Itsuka Kitto
Tsubasa wo Hirogete
Hitomi Sorasanaide
Hiroi Sekai de Kimi ni Deatta
Teenage Dream
Eien wo Azuketekure
Love Forever

Wands
Motto Tsuyoku Kimi wo Dakishimetara
Jumpin Jack Boy
Sekai wa Owaru Made wa
Koiseyo Otome
Tenshi ni Nante Narenakatta
Million Miles Away
Don't Cry
Flower
Keep on Dream
Foolish OK

T-Bolan
Heart of Stone
Afurederu Kanjou
Namida no Egao
Omoide ga Sagashiteru
Love
Baby Blue
Tooi Ai no Refrain
Natsu no Owari ni
Shiny Days
Friends

Field of View
Kimi ga Ita kara
Totsuzen
Last Good-bye
Kono Machi de Kimi to Kurashitai
Totsuzen

Rev
Dakishimetai
I just fall in love
Amai Kiss Kiss
Hateshinai Yume wo
Break Down

Baad
Aishitai Aisenai
Mabushii Romance

Keiko Utoku
Anata wa Yume no Naka Sotto Shinobikomitai
Mabushii Hito

Mi-Ke
Pink Christmas

Manish
Kono Isshun to Iu Eien no Naka de

Miho Komatsu
As, Beautiful Life, Sickness (Miho Komatsu 3rd : everywhere)

Aiuchi Rina
Glorious
Miracle
Story
Magic
Bara ga Saku Bara ga Chiru

U-ka Saegusa in dB
Daremo ga Kitto Dare ka no Santa Claus
Yukidoke no Ano Kawa no Nagare no youni
Kumo ni Notte
Itsumono no Egao de Watashi ga Itai
Precious Memories

Mai Kuraki
Growing of My Heart
Tomorrow is the last Time
Summer Time Gone
1000 Mankai no Kiss
State of mind

Aiko Kitahara
Fuyu Urara
Sekaijuu Doko wo Sagashitemo
Utopia
Natsu Dakara!
Cobalt Blue

Natsuiro
Kimi no Namida wa Konnani Koishiteru
Natsu no Taiyou no Sei ni shite

Interview
From J-Rock Magazine 1995/June edition

References

External links
Official website

1958 births
20th-century Japanese composers
Being Inc. artists
Japanese male composers
Living people
20th-century Japanese male musicians